Syntrophospora  bryantii is a species of bacteria belonging to the family Syntrophomonadaceae. It is the only described species in the genus Syntrophospora and has been proposed to be a part of the genus Syntrophomonas instead.

References 

Eubacteriales

Taxa described in 1990
Monotypic bacteria genera

Bacteria described in 1985